The Timekeeper is a Canadian drama film, directed by Louis Bélanger and released in 2009. Adapted from the novel of the same name by Trevor Ferguson, the film stars Craig Olejnik as Martin Bishop, a young man who takes a job on a railway construction crew in the Northwest Territories, but struggles under the harsh cruelty of crew foreman Fisk (Stephen McHattie). The cast also includes Roy Dupuis, Gary Farmer, Julian Richings and Wayne Robson.

Bélanger's first English-language feature film, it was shot in 2007 in the Port-Cartier and Sept-Îles regions of Quebec. Due to financial problems at distributor Christal Films, the film was not commercially released until it was picked up by Les Films Séville in 2009.

The film received five Jutra Award nominations at the 12th Jutra Awards in 2010, for Best Supporting Actor (McHattie), Best Art Direction (André-Line Beauparlant), Best Costume Design (Sophie Lefebvre), Best Makeup (Fanny Vachon) and Best Sound (Marcel Chouinard, Richard Lavoie, Dean Giammarco and Bill Sheppard).

References

External links

2009 films
Canadian drama films
English-language Canadian films
Films based on Canadian novels
Films directed by Louis Bélanger
Films shot in Quebec
Films set in the Northwest Territories
2000s English-language films
2000s Canadian films